Richard Samuel Springer (born January 25, 1948) is an American lawyer and former politician, who was previously a member of the Oregon House of Representatives and Oregon State Senate. While in the Oregon Senate, he served a stint as its Majority Leader.

Springer attended the University of Oregon and Princeton University. He served in the United States Navy in the Vietnam War. He is currently the district manager for the West Multnomah Soil & Water Conservation District.

References

1948 births
Living people
Democratic Party members of the Oregon House of Representatives
University of Oregon alumni
Princeton University alumni
Politicians from Portland, Oregon
Lawyers from Portland, Oregon